I Don Giovanni della Costa Azzurra ("Don Juan of the French Riviera"), released in English-speaking countries as Beach Casanova, is a 1962 Italian film, directed by Vittorio Sala. It stars Curd Jürgens, Annette Stroyberg, Martine Carol and Gabriele Ferzetti.

Plot

Cast 
Curd Jürgens - Mr. Edmond
Annette Stroyberg - Gloria
Martine Carol - Nadine Leblanc
Gabriele Ferzetti - Leblanc, the Lawyer
Daniela Rocca - Assuntina Greco, aka "Géneviève"
Paolo Ferrari - Michele
Eleonora Rossi Drago - Jasmine
Riccardo Garrone - Protettore di Assuntina
Ingrid Schoeller - Denise
Alberto Farnese - Commander
Agnès Spaak - Nicole
Tiberio Murgia - Melchiorre
Coccinelle - Herself
Francesco Mulè - Baldassarre Giaconia
Ignazio Leone - Gaspare Patanè
Mino Doro - Marito di Jasmine
Raffaella Carrà - Cameriera motel
Adriana Facchetti - American tourist
Giuseppe Porelli - Gloria's Father
Carlo Giustini - Yacht captain
Mylène Demongeot - Cameo
Jean-Paul Belmondo - Cameo

References

External links

1962 films
Italian comedy-drama films
1960s Italian-language films
Films directed by Vittorio Sala
1960s Italian films